Old East Baltimore Historic District is a national historic district in Baltimore, Maryland, United States. It is a mainly residential area of Baltimore City that grew up northward from the original mid-18th century settlement east of the Jones Falls, known as Jones Town, or Old Town. The southern part is characterized by vernacular Greek Revival-style working-class housing, constructed in the mid-1840s to mid-1850s for the large numbers of Irish and German immigrants settling there. By the late 1880s and early 1890s all of the blocks in the historic district had been filled with substantial rowhouses showing the influence of Queen Anne and Renaissance Revival styles. The churches in the district include good examples of Italianate, Gothic, Richardsonian Romanesque, Northern European Romanesque, and French Romanesque. Two ethnic Catholic churches, St. John the Evangelist Roman Catholic Church and St. James the Less Roman Catholic Church, are listed separately on the National Register of Historic Places.

It was added to the National Register of Historic Places in 2006.

References

External links
, including photo from 2005, at Maryland Historical Trust
Boundary Map of the Old East Baltimore Historic District, Baltimore City, at Maryland Historical Trust

Historic districts on the National Register of Historic Places in Baltimore
German-American culture in Baltimore
Irish-American culture in Baltimore
Georgian architecture in Maryland
Victorian architecture in Maryland
Working-class culture in Baltimore